Veľký Šariš is a small town near Prešov in eastern Slovakia. The town is known as the site of the largest brewery in Slovakia – Šariš Brewery.

Etymology
The etymology of the name is uncertain. Hungarian historians and linguists prefer the theory that it is derived from the Hungarian word sár or sáros (muddy). Slovak historians and linguists assume that the name comes from pre-Hungarian period and is of Slavic or even older origin.

Geography
There are ruins of Šariš Castle above the city, which were reconstructed in recent years and serve as place for various cultural events, such as music festivals or film festivals.

History
The area has been inhabited since prehistoric times. A Slavic settlement on the castle foot hill is dated to the 9th–10th century, other settlements were unearthed in the area of the town (9th–10th century, 10th–11th century, later abandoned settlement dated to the 12th–13th century) and at the location Dzikov potok (8th–9th century). The first written mention of Veľký Šariš dates back to 1217 (Sarus) The town was a royal town then a landlord town (since 1465).

Demographics
According to the 2001 census, the town had 4,018 inhabitants. 91.69% of inhabitants were Slovaks, 6.07% Roma, 0.60% Ukrainians and 0.55% Czechs. The religious makeup was 84.59% Roman Catholics, 4.55% people with no religious affiliation, 4.31% Greek Catholics and 2.56% Lutherans.

Economy
There is brewery Šariš located in town. The brewery was built in 1964 and is part of group SABMiller, which acquired brewery in 1997. Brewery has around 550 employees.

Twin towns — sister cities

Veľký Šariš is twinned with:
 Nyírtelek, Hungary
 Grybów, Poland
 Rakoshino, Ukraine

References

External links
 Official website
 Number of inhabitants 2011 (PDF)

Cities and towns in Slovakia
Šariš